The Minister of Defence and Veterans is a minister of the DR Congo government responsible for implementation of government defence policy and supervises the Armed Forces of the Democratic Republic of the Congo.

The President, Félix Tshisekedi is the Commander-in-Chief of the Armed Forces. Defence ministers, formally Ministers of Defence, and Veterans (Ancien Combattants), since the post-2002 transition began have been:
Jean-Pierre Ondekane (of the Rally for Congolese Democracy-Goma (RCD-G)), July 2003-January 2005
Adolphe Onusumba Yemba (of RCD-G), January 2005-February 2007
Chikez Diemu, February 2007-October 2008
Charles Mwando Simba, October 2008-April 2012
Alexandre Luba Ntambo, April 2012-December 2014
Aime Ngoy Mukena, December 2014-September 2015
, September 2015-
Laurent-Desire Kabila was serving as his own minister of defence in October 1997, and Joseph Kabila was doing the same while President in August 2002.

Previous defence ministers before 2003 included:
Jerome Anany (1960s)
Admiral Mavua Mudima (c.1994-97)
General Likulia Bolongo (c. 1997)

References

Omasombo 2009

Military of the Democratic Republic of the Congo
Defence
1960 establishments in the Republic of the Congo (Léopoldville)